Hardcard is the genericized trademark for a hard disk drive, disk controller, and host adapter on an expansion card for a personal computer.

Typically a hard disk drive (HDD) installs into a drive bay; cables connect the drive to a host adapter and power source. If the personal computer lacks an available bus on a compatible host adapter, then one may have to install an adapter into an expansion slot. The Hardcard supplies its own host adapter, and doesn't require an empty drive bay.

Plus Development, a subsidiary of Quantum Corporation, developed the first ISA Hardcard, and released it in October 1985. By June 1986, 28 of Plus Development's competitors were producing similar products. The term has been used generically to refer to any hard disk on a card.

History 

Quantum Corporation formed the Plus Development subsidiary in 1983. Plus Development invested their efforts in developing a hard disk drive that the average computer owner could install easily without much technical knowledge.

By 1985, Plus Development had engineered their first Hardcard; it had a 10 megabyte (MB) capacity; its suggested retail price was $1,095. In the mid-1980s, hard drives were as small as 1.6 inches tall, but in order to fit into a single ISA PC card expansion slot a custom one-inch thick hard drive had to be designed. Having spent $15 million on the project, Plus Development started shipping Hardcard in October 1985, and trademarked the Hardcard brand in 1988.

The Hardcard provided the computer industry with the first one-inch-thick HDD, but it was an interface and form factor only compatible with the full length card slot of the ISA bus first introduced with the IBM PC. As such it had a thicker head disk assembly than the subsequently introduced 1-inch high standard form factor 3-inch HDDs.

While sources inside the company during the launch of Hardcard claim it was the first HDD controller integrated into the drive printed circuit board, Xebec, a HDD controller manufacturer in the early 1980s, had already done that with their Owl product around August 1984. It was a complete 5.25 inch half-height HDD with an integrated controller and drive electronics on the same printed circuit board with a SASI interface.

Plus Development's Hardcard products
After the introduction of Hardcard, Plus Development continued working on higher capacity hard drives in the same form factor of the first Hardcard. The brand name became so widely known the name was continued through the follow on products.

The Hardcard II and Hardcard II XL were advertised with effective access times as a result of the disk cache. The Hardcard II listed both times, but Hardcard II XL only listed the effective access time. The Hardcard EZ line returned to listing the access times without the benefit of the cache.

All Hardcard products up to and including Hardcard II XL were produced under the Plus Development name. The Hardcard EZ was released under the Quantum name after Quantum absorbed the wholly owned subsidiary Plus Development.

Competition 

Within one year of the Plus Development introduction of Hardcard, 28 companies had released similar products. At that time, all of the other products were using a standard hard drive with a 1.6-inch height forcing the card to hang over the adjacent PC slot. The hard drive was located on the opposite side away from the connector sometimes enabling a short half-length expansion card to be installed in the adjacent slot. These hard drive cards were usually described as occupying 1.5 expansion slots.
Below are some of companies and product names with a similar product to the Plus Hardcard.
 JVC (Japan Victor Company)
 Kamerman Labs, (Beaverton, Oregon) – Slot Machine
 Maynard Electronics, (Casselberry, Florida) – On Board
 Microscience International Corp, (Mountain View, California) – EasyCard
 Mountain Computer Inc., (Scotts Valley, California) – DriveCard
 Qubie Distributing, (Camarillo, California) – Hardpack
 Tandon Corporation, (Chatsworth, California) – DiskCard, Business Card
 Verbatim Corporation, (Sunnyvale, California) – Data Bank
 Western Digital, (Irvine, California) – FileCard

Tandy 1000 

In 1985, Tandy introduced the Tandy 1000. Tandy offered a proprietary 20 megabyte hard card for $799. An 8-bit ISA slot was required to accommodate a hard card, preserving the drive bays for disk drives and CD-ROMs. The 8-bit slots were electronically compatible, but the computer could only hold a card up to 10 1/2 inches long. As a result, many hard cards such as those offered by Plus development were 13 inches long, and hence were not compatible.  Hard cards had to be certified as Tandy compatible, meaning they fit in a Tandy 1000 model such as the SX, TX, SL, and TL series.

A hard card must be no more than 10 inches long and use an 8-bit ISA interface to work in a Tandy 1000 computer. Usually, the card must be installed in slot 1 due to the overhang. The Tandy 1000's 60 watt power supply isn't sufficient to run some hard cards, so a more power-efficient card is preferable.

See also 
NVM Express, specification for installing solid state drives as PCIe expansion cards

References

Hard disk drives
IBM PC compatibles
Legacy hardware